Oksana Rasulova (born 19 December 1982) is an Azerbaijani dancer, choreographer and actress. She is an Indian classical dancer, including Bharatanatyam.

Early life
Rasulova was born in Shabran, Azerbaijani SSR. In her childhood, she moved with her family to Russia, where she started to learn Bharata Natyam.

Career
In 2001, she created "Chandra Muthi" dance group and started to work as choreographer.

In 2014, she was featured and won Zee TV's India's Best Cinestars Ki Khoj, a talent show for aspiring actors. She was often compared for her striking resemblance to the Indian actress Preity Zinta. And also won it along with Syed Mamoon in season 3. In the same year, she was awarded "Goddess of dance" statuette prize by Indian Embassy in Azerbaijan.

Personal life
She speaks fluent Hindi, along with her native Azerbaijani and Russian.

Filmography

References

1982 births
Living people
Azerbaijani film actresses
Azerbaijani female dancers
Bharatanatyam exponents
Performers of Indian classical dance
People from Şirvan, Azerbaijan